Revaz Chikoidze (born 30 May 1984) is a Georgian Paralympic judoka. He won silver in the Men's +100 kg in 2020.

References

External links
 

1984 births
Living people
Male judoka from Georgia (country)
Paralympic judoka of Georgia (country)
Paralympic silver medalists for Georgia (country)
Paralympic medalists in judo
Judoka at the 2020 Summer Paralympics
Medalists at the 2020 Summer Paralympics